Casey Thompson is an American chef and restaurateur from Dallas, Texas. She is currently executive chef at Folktable, a restaurant in Sonoma, California.

Thompson was a contestant on Top Chef: Miami, the third season of the television series Top Chef, in which she finished as runner-up and was voted Fan Favorite. She also appeared in Top Chef: All-Stars (season 8) and Top Chef: Charleston (season 14), and was a guest judge in episode 7 of Top Chef Junior.

Career
Thompson's professional start came at Dallas' The Mansion Restaurant, at Rosewood Mansion on Turtle Creek, under head chef Dean Fearing, where she worked her way up from a prep cook to becoming the sous chef. She later became executive chef at Shinsei, a Pan-Asian restaurant in Dallas.

Thompson was formerly executive chef at Brownstone in Fort Worth, Texas, and, between June and November 2014, the owner of Aveline at the Warwick Hotel in San Francisco.

In 2017, Thompson became executive chef at Morada, the restaurant at The Inn at Rancho Santa Fe.

She was due to open Georgette as a partner in late 2020, but it was put on hold due to COVID-19.

Thompson has also been appointed the U.S. ambassador for Terrazas de los Andes, a Moet-Hennessey brand.

Folktable

Since December 2020, Thompson has been the executive chef at Folktable, a restaurant at Cornerstone Sonoma marketplace in Sonoma, California.

In September 2021, just over a year into Thompson's time at the restaurant, it was named a Michelin Guide Bib Gourmand establishment.

Personal life
Thompson's partner is Michael DeSantis, co-owner of Harumph Wines.

References

External links 
 
 

Top Chef contestants
Living people
Chefs from Texas
Participants in American reality television series
American women chefs
Year of birth missing (living people)
21st-century American women